The J. L. Miner House is a historic house in Red Cloud, Nebraska. It was built in 1878 by J. L. Miner and Hugh Miner. Author Willa Cather was friends with the Miners's children, and she took inspiration from them to write about the Harling family in her 1918 novel, My Ántonia. The house was designed in the Italianate architectural style. It has been listed on the National Register of Historic Places since August 11, 1982.

References

External links

	
National Register of Historic Places in Webster County, Nebraska
Italianate architecture in Nebraska
Houses completed in 1878